"Hello Walls" is an American country music song written by Willie Nelson and first recorded by Faron Young. It became a massive hit in 1961, reaching number 1 country and spent 23 weeks on the chart. On other charts, it peaked at number 12 pop, and was Young's only top 40 pop hit in the United States. Young's version featured Floyd “Lightnin’” Chance on double bass.

“Hello Walls” introduced Nelson to a national audience. In 1996, Nelson recorded a rock version of the song with the band The Reverend Horton Heat for the album Twisted Willie.

Content
The lyrics portray a man's lonely conversation with his walls, window and ceiling after having been jilted by his lover.

Chart performance

Other notable recordings
Ralph Emery had an answer song called "Hello Fool" in 1961, which peaked at number 4 on the Country Charts.  That song was Emery's only hit as a singer.

References

External links
 Willie Nelson's Official Website

1961 singles
Faron Young songs
Willie Nelson songs
Grammy Hall of Fame Award recipients
Songs written by Willie Nelson
Song recordings produced by Ken Nelson (American record producer)
1961 songs
Capitol Records singles